Phyllocnistis stereograpta is a moth of the family Gracillariidae, known from Maharashtra, India.

The hostplant for the species is Stereospermum suaveolens. They mine the leaves of their host plant. The mine consists of a wandering gallery in the leaf.

References

Phyllocnistis
Endemic fauna of India
Moths of Asia